James J. Lack (born October 18, 1944) is an American lawyer and politician from New York.

Life
He was born on October 18, 1944, the son of Eve Lack (1907–2001). He graduated B.A. from the University of Pennsylvania in 1966, and J.D. from Fordham Law School in 1969. He began to practice law in Huntington.

He entered politics as a Republican, and was Commissioner of Consumer Affairs of Suffolk County.

Lack represented the 2nd district of the New York State Senate from 1979 to 2002, sitting in the 183rd, 184th, 185th, 186th, 187th, 188th, 189th, 190th, 191st, 192nd, 193rd and 194th New York State Legislatures.

On December 17, 2002, he was appointed as a justice of the New York Court of Claims. He resigned from the bench on January 31, 2011.

He lives in East Northport.

References

External links

1944 births
Living people
People from East Northport, New York
Republican Party New York (state) state senators
New York (state) state court judges
University of Pennsylvania alumni
Fordham University School of Law alumni